William Beatty Rochester (January 29, 1789 Hagerstown, Washington County, Maryland – June 14, 1838) was an American lawyer and politician from New York.

Early life
Rochester was the first child of Col. Nathaniel Rochester (1752–1831), founder of the City of Rochester, New York, and Sophia (née Beatty) Rochester (1768–1845).  Mayor Thomas H. Rochester was his brother.

He attended the public schools and graduated from Charlotte Hall Military Academy.

Career
During the War of 1812, Rochester was an aide-de-camp to Gen. George McClure.  After the war, he studied law with his uncle Judge Adam Beatty and with Henry Clay, was admitted to the bar, and began practice in Bath, New York. Later, he removed to Angelica, New York.

Rochester was a member of the New York State Assembly (Allegany and Steuben Co.) in 1816-17 and 1818. Rochester was a presidential elector in 1820, voting for James Monroe and Daniel D. Tompkins.

Rochester was elected as a Democratic-Republican to the 17th, and re-elected as a Crawford Democratic-Republican to the 18th United States Congress, holding office from December 3, 1821, until 1823. He was appointed as Judge of the Eight Circuit Court on April 21, 1823, and resigned from the House of Representatives.  He resigned from the bench to run on the Bucktails ticket for Governor of New York in 1826, but was narrowly defeated by DeWitt Clinton.

He was Secretary to the Special Envoy Extraordinary and Minister Plenipotentiary to Colombia in 1826, and Chargé d'affaires to Central America in 1827–28.  He was appointed Chargé d'Affaires of Guatemala on March 3, 1827, and was commissioned to the Republic of Central America.  He reached Central America, but returned to the United States without presenting credentials.

Later career
In 1828, he was appointed by Nicholas Biddle as president of the branch of the Second Bank of the United States at Buffalo, New York, remaining there until 1836.  He later served as president of the Bank of Pensacola, Florida and a director of the Alabama and Florida Railroad.

Personal life
In 1812, he married his first wife Harriet Irwin (d. 1815), and their son was:

 Nathaniel Montgomery Rochester (1813–1823).

On January 31, 1816, he married his second wife Amanda Hopkins (1799–1831), and their children were:

 James Hervey Rochester (1819–1860), who married Evelina Throop Martin (1822–1907), a niece of Gov. Enos T. Throop
 Harriet Louisa Rochester (1821–1854), who married Hugh L. Bull
 Sophia Elizabeth Rochester (1823–1824)

 William Beatty Rochester, Jr. (1826–1909), a brigadier general of the United States Army
 Nathaniel Elie Rochester (1829–1833).

On April 9, 1832, he married his third wife Eliza (née Hatch) Powers (1800–1885), a half-sister of Gov. Enos T. Throop and the widow of U.S. Rep. Gershom Powers. Together, William and Eliza were the parents of:

 Eliza Hatch Rochester (1833–1868), who married Augus B. Fitch
 George William Rochester (1835–1837).

Rochester died in the wreck of the steamer Pulaski off the coast of North Carolina on June 14, 1838.

References

External links 
 
 

1789 births
1838 deaths
Politicians from Hagerstown, Maryland
United States Army personnel of the War of 1812
Accidental deaths in North Carolina
Deaths due to shipwreck at sea
Members of the New York State Assembly
People from Steuben County, New York
People from Angelica, New York
19th-century American railroad executives
Charlotte Hall Military Academy alumni
1820 United States presidential electors
Democratic-Republican Party members of the United States House of Representatives from New York (state)
19th-century American politicians